DGP may refer to:
 
 Drawn, ground, and polished, a finishing process for metal shafting
 Director general of police, a police rank in India
 Deutsche Grenzpolizei, East German border guards
 Democratic Progress Party, a right-wing political party in Turkey
 Development guide plan, an urban plan of Singapore's Urban Redevelopment Authority
 DGP gravity, in physics, a brane world model of the universe published by Dvali, Gabadadze and Poratti
 Dynamic Graphics Project, a computer science lab at the University of Toronto
 Digest Group Publications, an American game company